Arne Nævra  (born 7 December 1953) is a Norwegian photographer and politician.

Nævra was born in Øvre Eiker. He was elected representative to the Storting from Buskerud for the period 2017–2021 for the Socialist Left Party.

Nævra has studied biology and ecology at the University of Oslo, and is a nature photographer and film producer by profession. His books include Norske Rovdyr from 1997, Dyrene på Langedrag from 2001, and Villdyr og Villmark from 2010.

He was awarded Friluftslivets Hederspris in 2013.

References

1953 births
Living people
People from Øvre Eiker
Socialist Left Party (Norway) politicians
Members of the Storting
Buskerud politicians
University of Oslo alumni
Norwegian photographers
Nature photographers